Filippo Azzaiolo (Sometimes spelled: Assaiuolo) was a 16th-century Italian composer. His surviving compositions were published in three collections issued between 1557 and 1569. The dedicatees each have links to Bologna, so it seems likely that Azzaiolo himself had connections to that city.

Azzaiolo's Chi passa per 'sta strada was adapted by English composer William Byrd. The contemporary composer Panayiotis Demopoulos has also written a set of variations for woodwind quintet on the same vilotta, issued by Dunelm Records and published by anaeresis.

References

 Anne Schnoebelen: "Azzaiolo, Filippo", Grove Music Online, ed. L. Macy (Accessed March 21, 2008), (subscription access)

External links

Italian classical composers
Italian male classical composers
Renaissance composers
16th-century Italian composers